The Classic for Girls is a 1934 Chinese film directed by Cheng Bugao, Chen Kengran, Li Pingqian, Shen Xiling, Xu Yinfu, Yao Sufeng, Zhang Shichuan and Zheng Zhengqiu. This movie was inspired by a novel after the same name, which depicted the repressive society women in China were under back then.

External links 

1934 films
Chinese black-and-white films
1930s Mandarin-language films
Chinese drama films
1934 drama films